Kingsbury may refer to:

Places

United Kingdom 
 Kingsbury, London, a district of northwest London in the borough of Brent
 Kingsbury tube station, London Underground station
 Kingsbury, Warwickshire, a village and civil parish in Warwickshire, England
 Kingsbury Episcopi, village and civil parish in Somerset, England
 Kingsbury Regis, a hamlet in Milborne Port, Somerset, England
 Kingsbury Reservoir, old name for the Brent Reservoir in London
 Hundred of Kingsbury, a historical Hundred in the ceremonial county of Somerset, England
 Kingsbury, former name of Tyburn, a ward in Birmingham, England

Australia 
 Kingsbury, Victoria, a suburb in Melbourne
 Kingsbury Tourist Drive, a scenic drive in Western Australia

Canada 
 Kingsbury, Quebec, a village municipality in the Estrie region

Sri Lanka 
 The Kingsbury, a hotel in Colombo

United States 
 Kingsbury, Indiana, a town in Washington Township, LaPorte County
 Kingsbury, Nevada, a census-designated place in Douglas County
 Kingsbury, New York, a town in Washington County
 Kingsbury, Ohio, an unincorporated community in Meigs County
 Kingsbury, Texas, a city in Guadalupe County
 Kingsbury Auxiliary Airfield, an airport in San Joaquin County, California
 Kingsbury Brook, a tributary of Huntington Creek in Luzerne County, Pennsylvania
 Kingsbury County, South Dakota
 Kingsbury Creek, a stream in St. Louis County, Minnesota
 Kingsbury Fish and Wildlife Area, a protected area in LaPorte County, Indiana
 Kingsbury Grade, a state highway in Douglas County, Nevada
 Kingsbury Hall, a performing-arts center at the University of Utah, Salt Lake City, Utah
 Kingsbury House, a historic house in Newton, Massachusetts
 Kingsbury Place, a private place neighborhood in St. Louis, Missouri
 Kingsbury Plantation, Maine, a plantation in Piscataquis County
 Kingsbury Run, an area on the southeast side of Cleveland, Ohio

People 
 Kingsbury (band), an American indie rock band
 Kingsbury (surname) (including a list of people with the name)
 The Kingsbury family, an influential English family
 Albert Kingsbury, inventor of the hydrodynamic Kingsbury thrust bearing
 Aubrey Kingsbury, American soccer goalkeeper

Other 
 
 Kingsbury Aviation
 Kingsbury Commitment A 1913 AT&T agreement authored by Nathan Kingsbury with the United States government

See also 
 Kingsbury School (disambiguation)
 
 Kingsburg (disambiguation)